Commercial Bank of Dubai (CBD) is a UAE banking and financial services corporation headquartered in Deira, Dubai. It also figures in the Dubai Financial Market index.

History
CBD was founded in 1969, by an Amiri Decree issued by the late Rashid Bin Saeed Al Maktoum. What started out as a joint venture of Commerzbank, Chase Manhattan Bank and Commercial Bank of Kuwait, evolved into a National Public shareholding company by 1982. 80% of its shares are held by UAE nationals, while the other 20% are owned by Investment Corporation of Dubai (an investment division of the Dubai Government).

CBD provides Wholesale, Corporate, Retail, Business, SME, Private and Affluent banking services.

Financial data
In 2019, Commercial Bank of Dubai reported a net profit of AED 1,400 million, an increase of 20.5% over 2018, and total assets of AED 88.1 billion. Operating income for 2019 amounted to AED 3,033 million, an increase of 11.3% attributable to a 2.8% increase in Net Interest Income (NII) and a 31.2% increase in Other Operating Income (OOI). Fees and commission income increased by 21.3%, foreign exchange income registered a 37.7% increase, investment income increased by 179.4%, and other income increased by 53.3% compared to 2018. CBD has a credit rating of Baa1 and A- by Moody & Fitch respectively.

External links
 Official Website

References

Banks of the United Arab Emirates
Government-owned companies of the United Arab Emirates
Emirati companies established in 1969
Banks established in 1969